The Our Lady of Mount Carmel Church is a late 20th century Parish church in Fgura, Malta. It was designed in 1981 by Architect and Engineer Godfrey Azzopardi and built in 1988. The presbytery was designed a year before its construction by Edward Micallef. The building is a listed monument and an active Roman Catholic Church.

History

Architect Godfrey Azzopardi received consultations from then the Head of Architecture of Maltconsult International, Architect Edward Micallef, when he was given advise over the unusual architecture of the structure. The main material supporting the building is reinforced concrete. The layout from the exterior is pyramidical, with a triangular opening on each four sides, which gives the impression of a floating building aimed to appear as a tent. The main façade is characterized by a statue of Jesus on a crucifix which was originally designed for the interior. The main feature of the interior, beside other ecclesiastic ornaments, is the presbytery that was designed by Micallef in 1987. The stained glass was designed by artist Alfred Camilleri. The Church is run by the Carmelite Fathers, a Roman Catholic institution, and remains active.

The church is listed on the National Inventory of the Cultural Property of the Maltese Islands (NICPMI).

Further reading

Pages 14-15

See also
List of monuments in Fgura

References

External links
Parish Church of Our Lady of Mount Carmel

Roman Catholic churches completed in 1988
Carmelite churches in Malta
Fgura
20th-century Roman Catholic church buildings in Malta